The Central United States is sometimes conceived as between the Eastern and Western as part of a three-region model, roughly coincident with the U.S. Census's definition of the Midwestern United States plus the western and central portions of the U.S. Census's definition of the Southern United States. The Central States are typically considered to consist of North Dakota, South Dakota, Nebraska, Kansas, Oklahoma, Texas, Minnesota, Iowa, Missouri, Arkansas, Louisiana, Wisconsin, Illinois, Michigan, Indiana, Ohio, Kentucky, Tennessee, West Virginia, Mississippi and Alabama.

Chicago is the area's largest city and metropolitan area; other large cities with large metropolitan areas would be Houston, Dallas, Fort Worth, San Antonio, Austin, Oklahoma City, Tulsa, Kansas City, Kansas and Kansas City, Missouri, Topeka, Wichita, Omaha, Nebraska and Lincoln, Minneapolis and St. Paul, Madison and Milwaukee, St. Louis, Louisville, Lexington, Detroit, Cincinnati, Cleveland, Columbus, Toledo, Dayton, Rockford, Peoria, Indianapolis, Evansville, Fort Wayne and South Bend.

Four of nine Census Bureau Divisions have names containing "Central", though they are not grouped as a region. They include 20 states and 39.45% of the U.S. population as of July 1, 2007.

Almost all of the area is in the Gulf of Mexico drainage basin and most of that is in the Mississippi Basin. Small waterways near the Great Lakes drain into the Great Lakes, and eventually the St. Lawrence River. The Red River Valley is centered on the North Dakota-Minnesota border and drains to Hudson Bay. Floods have been a problem for the region during the 20th and early 21st century.

The Central Time Zone includes portions of the Florida Panhandle, upper portions of Michigan, parts of Indiana, western Kentucky, western Tennessee, all of Texas except El Paso, and extends to the westernmost fringes of Great Plains states.

Gallery

Central regions defined by organizations 
Different organizations define the central regions of the United States in a variety of ways:
YPO Only 6 central states of the Midwest, plus KY
CERI All of Midwest and South including MD, DE
NOAA Midwest minus OH, plus KY, CO, WY
HSUS Midwest minus ND, SD, KS, plus KY
USGS West North Central States, South Central United States, 4 eastern Mountain states
Adventure Camp Midwest plus South minus Atlantic states, AL, WV
Geography of the Interior United States
MLB's National League Central Division, members in PA, OH, WI, IL, MO; TX through 2012
MLB's American League Central Division, members in OH, MI, IL, MN, MO
NBA's Central Division, members in OH, MI, IN, IL, WI, former members from NC, FL, GA, LA and Ontario (Canada)
NHL's Central Division, members in CO, MN, TN, TX, IL, MO and Manitoba (Canada), former members in MI, AZ, OH and Ontario (Canada)
The NFL's former National Football Conference Central Division, members in FL, MI, IL, WI, and MN
The NFL's former American Football Conference Central Division, members in MD, PA, FL, OH, TN, former member from TX

Geographic center of the United States 
The geographic midpoint of the contiguous 48 states of the United States falls within the boundaries of the Central United States and is located about two miles northwest of Lebanon, Kansas. The spot is located at 39 degrees 50 minutes latitude and 98 degrees 35 minutes longitude.

See also 
 Central Canada
 Great Lakes region
 List of regions of the United States

Notes

References 

Regions of the United States
Articles containing video clips